Joel John Bailey (born February 17, 1980) is a forward who last played for the Carolina RailHawks of the USL First Division. He played three seasons in Major Indoor Soccer League.

Club career

Indoor

Bailey began his indoor soccer career in 2003 with the now defunct Cleveland Force of Major Indoor Soccer League. On March 29, 2005, the Force traded Bailey and Sipho Sibiya to the Baltimore Blast for Neil Gilbert and Allen Eller.  During the 2005–2006 season, Bailey played twenty-nine games with the MISL championship winning Blast and he left indoor soccer at the end of the season.

Outdoor

He began his outdoor career with the Montreal Impact in 2004 where he finished fourth in scoring and helped the Impact win the championship.  In 2005, he signed a two-year contract, but was waived at the end of the 2006 season. He signed with the Vancouver Whitecaps in 2007, and was traded mid-season to the RailHawks in exchange for Sola Abolaji.

International career
Bailey made his debut for Trinidad and Tobago in a January 2007 CONCACAF Gold Cup qualifying match against Martinique, coming on as a substitute for Darryl Roberts. He has earned a total of 4 caps.

References

1980 births
Living people
North Carolina FC players
Wheeling University alumni
Expatriate soccer players in Canada
Expatriate soccer players in the United States
Association football forwards
Major Indoor Soccer League (2001–2008) players
Montreal Impact (1992–2011) players
People from San Fernando, Trinidad and Tobago
Trinidad and Tobago expatriate footballers
Trinidad and Tobago expatriate sportspeople in Canada
Trinidad and Tobago expatriate sportspeople in the United States
Trinidad and Tobago footballers
A-League (1995–2004) players
USL First Division players
Vancouver Whitecaps (1986–2010) players
Cleveland Force (2002–2005 MISL) players
Baltimore Blast (2001–2008 MISL) players
TT Pro League players
Trinidad and Tobago international footballers